Wanderers Grounds is a sporting complex in Halifax, Nova Scotia, and home to Canadian Premier League professional soccer club HFX Wanderers FC.

The grounds were originally part of the Halifax Commons. The land was used in the 1880s by the Halifax Wanderers Amateur Athletic Club (WAAC) and was their home grounds for the sports of rugby and lawn bowling. Leased to the club in the 1800s, the club failed to pay its lease fees during the Second World War and the land's use reverted to the City of Halifax (Halifax Regional Municipality) who have maintained it since then. 

The Wanderers Grounds was also the home of the Halifax Pelham Canadians of the Nova Scotia Senior Baseball league 1977–2008. Years prior, Babe Ruth made an appearance at the grounds in 1942 during a navy baseball game between Halifax and Toronto. He faced Halifax pitcher Awkie Titus but failed to hit a home run.

The field house, built by the club in 1896, was destroyed by fire. It was replaced by the Navy League Dry Canteen, which was going to be rehabilitated in the 21st century, but was considered too structurally unsound. The plan to build a clubhouse has been put on an indeterminate hiatus.

On August 31, 1957, Wanderers Grounds hosted Canada Soccer's first ever Challenge Trophy match played east of Montreal. The local side Halifax Shipyards lost 8–2 to the eventual national champions, Montreal Ukraina.

On June 20, 2017 Halifax city councillors unanimously approved the construction of a temporary stadium at the Grounds, for a future Canadian Premier League professional soccer team. In May 2018, that team was confirmed to be named HFX Wanderers FC, who began play in 2019.

Sports usage 

The field has been used for matches of soccer, cricket, matches of rugby football, baseball and track and field championships among other sports.

Rugby union

See also
 List of Canadian Premier League stadiums

References 

Parks in Halifax, Nova Scotia
Sports venues in Nova Scotia
Soccer venues in Canada
Defunct baseball venues in Canada
Defunct rugby union venues
Rugby union stadiums in Canada
Canadian Premier League stadiums
HFX Wanderers FC
Baseball in Nova Scotia